Player's Secrets of Ariya is an accessory for the 2nd edition of the Advanced Dungeons & Dragons fantasy role-playing game, published in 1995.

Contents
Player's Secrets of Ariya is a sourcebook for Birthright that describes Ariya, a theocratic domain on the south coast of Khinasi.

Publication history
Player's Secrets of Ariya was published by TSR, Inc. in 1995.

Reception
Cliff Ramshaw reviewed Player's Secrets of Ariya for Arcane magazine, rating it a 7 out of 10 overall. He described Ariya as a "sun-kissed domain" that is "exceptional if only because rather than yet another variation on Northern European feudalism it's an altogether more romantic, magical and unfamiliar place - one that owes much to the Arabian Nights". Ramshaw felt that the domain of Ariya is "imbued with spicy richness", he felt that the plot hooks were "somewhat ordinary", saying: "They're not bad, just not as imaginative as the setting itself. Still, there's plenty here to get a good referee improvising."

References

Birthright (campaign setting) supplements
Role-playing game supplements introduced in 1995